Mars Cars is an Apple II maze game written by David Husch and published by Datamost in 1982.

Gameplay
The player maneuvers a car to collect four treasures—one in each corner of the screen—while avoiding computer-controlled Mars Cars (which look more like aliens than vehicles). Getting touched by a Mars Car results in loss of a life.  The player's car is allowed to drive through and remove the barriers making up the maze, but Mars Cars cannot. When all treasures are collected, the player can start the next level by driving into the warp area on the right side of the screen. There are sixteen levels.

References

External links

1982 video games
Apple II games
Apple II-only games
Datamost games
Maze games
Video games developed in the United States
Single-player video games